Pyrrhocoridae is a family of insects with more than 300 species world-wide. Many are red coloured and are known as red bugs and some species are called cotton stainers because their feeding activities leave an indelible yellow-brownish stain on cotton crops. A common species in parts of Europe is the firebug, and its genus name Pyrrhocoris and the family name are derived from the Greek roots for fire "pyrrho-" and bug "coris". Members of this family are often confused with, but can be quickly separated from, Lygaeidae by the lack of ocelli (simple eyes) on the top of the head.

Description
The membrane of the forewing has one or two cells from which about 7-8 branching veins emerge that may have branches that fuse together (anastomose) while the main veins reach the margins of the wing. They have three tarsal segments. They can be very difficult to separate from some members of the family Largidae, which also share some of these characters and belong to the same superfamily. Largids tend to have the edge of the pronotum (the top of the first thoracic segment) rounded, but the taxonomic feature for separating them is the found only in females. Female largids have the sixth visible (actually the seventh) abdominal segment appearing to be split in the middle, whereas it is undivided in female pyrrhocorids. A few bugs in the family Rhopalidae have similar colors (e.g., Corizus hyoscyami) but they have ocelli, as do lygaeids.

The scutellum is small and triangular. The antennae are made up of four segments, with the second segment longer than the third. The beak-like mouthpart, or rostrum, has four segments, and its tip reaches at least the base of the middle pair of legs. Some species have the wing reduced so that the abdomen is visible from above. More detailed distinguishing features that are usually visible only under a microscope, include a much reduced scent gland opening on the mid-thoracic segment. There are three sensory hairs or trichobothria on the abdominal segments 3 to 6 and two such hairs on the seventh segment.

The genus Myrmoplasta is found in the African and Oriental regions and is somewhat unusual in having highly reduced wings and appearing ant-like or myrmecomorphic. Males and females differ in their foreleg morphology, although such sexual dimorphism is also found in a few other genera.

Food
Most species feed on seeds or fruits particularly of plants belonging to the Malvales but a few feed on rotting debris including dead animal matter. A few species are predatory; Raxa nishidai is a predator of another pyrrhocorid, Melamphaus faber, while Antilochus coquebertii feeds on other bugs including Dysdercus cingulatus. A few are important crop pests. One species, Dysdercus suturellus, is well known in the southern cotton growing regions of the United States while Dysdercus cingulatus occurs on cotton in tropical Asia. They damage cotton bolls by staining as well as by cutting the fibres.

Genera
There are numerous genera within the family and these include:

 Abulfeda
 Aderrhis
 Aeschines
 Antilochus
 Armatillus
 Callibaphus
 Courtesius
 Cenaeus
 Delecampius
 Dermatinus
 Dindymus
 Dynamenais
 Dysdercus
 Ectatops
 Euscopus
 Froeschnerocoris
 Gromierus
 Indra
 Jourdainana
 Leptophthalmus
 Melamphaus
 Myrmoplasta
 Neodindymus
 Neoindra
 Probergrothius (Odontopus is preoccupied)
 Pyrrhocoris
 Pyrrhopeplus
 Raxa
 Roscius
 Saldoides
 Scantius
 Schmitziana
 Sericocoris
 Siango
 Sicnatus
 Stictaulax
 Syncrotus

References

External links
 Dysdercus suturellus, cotton stainer on the UF / IFAS Featured Creatures Web site

 
Heteroptera families
Taxa named by Franz Xaver Fieber